The Edwin Smith House in Wellington, Kansas was built in 1935.  Also known as the Pink House, it was listed on the National Register of Historic Places in 2004.

It has a -long facade topped by a parapet.  It originally featured pink stucco.  It is Spanish eclectic in style, and unusual in its small-town Kansas setting. The house is surrounded on all sides by both the First Baptist Church of Wellington and the United Methodist Church.

References

Houses on the National Register of Historic Places in Kansas
Colonial Revival architecture in Kansas
Mission Revival architecture in Kansas
Houses completed in 1935
National Register of Historic Places in Sumner County, Kansas